Nikolajs Rasso (born 18 October 1890, date of death unknown) was a Russian Empire long-distance runner. He competed in the marathon at the 1912 Summer Olympics.

References

1890 births
Year of death missing
Athletes (track and field) at the 1912 Summer Olympics
Male long-distance runners from the Russian Empire
Male marathon runners from the Russian Empire
Olympic competitors for the Russian Empire